Bologi may refer to any of several leaf vegetables eaten in West Africa:

 Basella alba, also called broad bologi
 Talinum fruticosum, also called Lagos bologi
 Crassocephalum biafrae, also called Sierra Leone bologi
 Crassocephalum crepidioides
 Crassocephalum rubens, also called Yoruban bologi